Citizens band radio (also known as CB radio) is a system of short-distance radio communications between individuals on a selection of channels within the 27-MHz (11 m) band.  In India, this frequency band extends from  26.957 MHz to 27.283 MHz. There are several different channel plans in use.  Citizens band is distinct from the Family Radio Service, GMRS, Multi-Use Radio Service and amateur radio (Ham). In many countries CB operation does not require a license, and (unlike amateur radio) it may be used for business or personal communications. Like many other two-way radio services, any citizens band channel is shared by many users. Only one station may transmit in a channel at a time; other stations must listen and wait for the shared channel to be available. Also, the system works in half-duplex mode, which means we may transmit and receive information, but not both at the same time.

Legislation guiding usage of CB radio equipment 
The establishment of, maintenance of, working with, possession of or dealing with in wireless equipment operating in citizens band was exempted from licensing under the Indian Telegraph Act, 1933 and the Indian Wireless Telegraphy Act, 1933, by Notification No G.S.R. 533(E) dated 12 August 2005 (published in the Gazette of India Extraordinary dated 12 August 2005).

After the aforesaid legislation, an amendment to the Use of low power equipment in the Citizen band 26.957 – 27.283 MHz (Exemption from Licensing Requirement) Rules, 2005 (hereafter referred to as the "Rules, 2005" for brevity) was made vide Notification No G.S.R. 35(E) dated 10 January 2007 (published in Gazette of India Extraordinary dated 22 January 2007). By the Amendment, amongst other changes, Rule 4 was amended to include an opportunity of the user of the unlicensed equipment to relocate equipment, reduce its power, use special antennae, or discontinue use of such unlicensed radio equipment as exempted under the Rules, 2005.  The Amendment also provided for a reasonable opportunity to be given to such user to explain the circumstances of usage which caused harmful interference with use of licensed equipment by a licensed user. The aforesaid amended Rules, 2005 are governing the licensing of CB radio equipment and its usage in India now.(No Reference regarding this anyone viewing please add)

Regulation in India
 
The channel assignments in India are different from the band plans used elsewhere. The Indian band plan consists of 40 frequencies spaced a relatively tight eight kHz apart, plus a few offset channels used for mountaineering and radio-controlled devices.  Many of the channels are reserved for specific purposes such as forestry, disaster relief, and sporting events.
The frequency band allocated for this purpose in India is 26.957-27.283 MHz. Nonetheless, the effective radiating power used for Citizens Band is limited within 5 Watt in India.
PMR Frequency 446 MHz with maximum 0.5W(Erp) also allowed as Licence Free in India since 2018. According to GSR 1047(E) dated 18 October 2018.

CB band plan
It appears that, as of 2015, several CB manufacturers and distributors are now shipping radios with the India CB band programmed in them.  These are generally "multi-norm" radios that provide the user with flexibility in regards to different frequency plans and mode (AM, FM, SSB) regulations. President, AnyTone, CRT and other companies are including the "IN" country as an option now. The channel plan programmed in these radios does not match up with the channel plan listed below (odd offset plan starting at 26.964 MHz for channel 1). Instead, the channel plan used is similar to the European standardized 40 channel CB band (AM and FM mode allowed, 4 watts FM, 1 watt AM carrier power for 4 watts peak power – within compliance of the 5 watt limit for India). However, due to the frequency allocation in India being 26.957 – 27.283 MHz, the band plan is 27 channels.  Starting with 26.965 MHz for channel 1 and ending at 27.275 MHz for channel 27.  This band plan (26.960 – 27.280 MHz) is within the limits prescribed by the Ministry of Communications and Information Technology (Wireless Planning and Coordination Wing). There does not appear to be an official CB channel-to-frequency table as part of the legislation listed as a reference for the "offset" frequency plan. Only the frequency range and power output limits are specified.

It is therefore likely that the "offset" frequency plan originally listed (44 channels in plan total, 11 R/C remote control channels, no mode (AM or FM) specified, no channel number associated, etc.  It is possible that the older 44/33 channel list is obsolete, as no radios are produced that offer the offset frequency plan. However, it is probable that both channel plans are currently in use in India, and this will likely continue into the foreseeable future. The 27-channel plan offers wider channel spacing to reduce interference, compatibility with internationally agreed channel plans, and provision for five dedicated and one shared remote control (R/C) for toys, aircraft, boats, telemetry, paging and other non-voice communications.  Channels 1–27 are the same as the channels 1–27 for the USA, Australian, and European Union standard channel plans. Not included are the five dedicated R/C frequencies 26.995 MHz, 27.045 MHz, 27.095 MHz, 27.145 MHz, 27.195 MHz and the shared R/C and CB voice frequency of Channel 23 – 27.255 MHz.

Updated 27 channel CB radio channel plan (with 5 R/C frequencies annotated):

Popular use
Citizens Band radio is a good option for long-haul truck drivers to communicate directions, traffic problems and other relevant matters.

Unlicensed communications
Family Radio Service (FRS) UHF CB system used in the USA and Canada
KDR 444 
LPD433
UHF CB
Citizens band radio 
Multi-Use Radio Service (MURS)
Personal radio service
General Mobile Radio Service (GMRS)
Unlicensed Personal Communications Services

See also
Amateur radio
Amateur radio in India

References

Amateur radio in India
Communications in India
India